Cox's Bazar-3 is a constituency represented in the Jatiya Sangsad (National Parliament) of Bangladesh since 2014 by Shaimum Sarwar Kamal of the Awami League.

Boundaries 
The constituency encompasses Cox's Bazar Sadar and Ramu upazilas. And also Eidgaon upazila

History 
The constituency was created in 1984 from the Chittagong-17 constituency when the former Chittagong District was split into two districts: Chittagong and Cox's Bazar. The boundaries remained the same.

Members of Parliament

Elections

Elections in the 2010s 
Shaimum Sarwar Kamal was elected unopposed in the 2014 general election after opposition parties withdrew their candidacies in a boycott of the election.

Elections in the 2000s 

The BNP candidate died days before the 1 October 2001 general election. Voting in the constituency was postponed until 1 November. Mohammad Sahiduzzaman, the deceased's younger brother, ran in his place.

Elections in the 1990s

References

External links
 

Parliamentary constituencies in Bangladesh
Cox's Bazar District